Will Martin (born April 29, 1970) is an American sailor. He competed in the Finn event at the 1996 Summer Olympics.

References

External links
 

1970 births
Living people
American male sailors (sport)
Olympic sailors of the United States
Sailors at the 1996 Summer Olympics – Finn
Sportspeople from Charleston, South Carolina